Callicephalus is a monotypic genus of flowering plants in the family Asteraceae, containing the single species Callicephalus nitens. It is native to the middle and low mountains of the Caucasus, where it has been recorded in Armenia, Azerbaijan, Georgia, Russia, and Turkey.

The genus is considered part of the Rhaponticum group in the Asteraceae tribe Cynareae, but according to molecular analyses it has no close relatives. Its isolation in the phylogeny of the tribe suggests it is a relict taxon, one of many relict plants that grow in the Caucasus.

References

Further reading
Hidalgo, O., et al. (2007). Karyological evolution in Rhaponticum Vaill. (Asteraceae, Cardueae) and related genera. Botanical Journal of the Linnean Society 153(2), 193–201.

Cynareae
Monotypic Asteraceae genera